Luke 13 is the thirteenth chapter of the Gospel of Luke in the New Testament of the Christian Bible. It records several parables and teachings told by Jesus Christ and his lamentation over the city of Jerusalem. Jesus resumes the journey to Jerusalem which he had embarked upon in Luke 9:51. The author of this chapter is unattributed, however early Christian tradition generally accepts that Luke the Evangelist composed this Gospel as well as the Acts of the Apostles.

Text
The original text was written in Koine Greek. This chapter is divided into 35 verses.

Textual witnesses
Some early manuscripts containing the text of this chapter are:
Papyrus 75 (AD 175-225)
Papyrus 45 (~250)
Papyrus 138 (3rd century; extant verses 13–17, 25–30)
Codex Vaticanus (325-350)
Codex Sinaiticus (330-360)
Codex Bezae (~ 400)
Codex Washingtonianus (~ 400)
Codex Alexandrinus (400-440)

Sub-divisions
The New King James Version organises this chapter as follows (with cross references to other parts of the Bible):
  = Repent or Perish
  = The Parable of the Barren Fig Tree
  = A Spirit of Infirmity
  = The Parable of the Mustard Seed
  = The Parable of the Leaven
  = The Narrow Way
  = Jesus Laments over Jerusalem (see also )

Old Testament references
: Psalm .

Repent or Perish (verses 1–5)

Jesus received a report that Pontius Pilate, who was described by Philo of Alexandria as cruel, corrupt, and unnecessarily violent, had killed some Galileans while they were worshiping God by offering sacrifices according to the Jewish religious law. This discussion is only recorded in Luke's gospel, and the incident is not otherwise known to history.

Apparently those making the report, an identified group of people, were looking for Jesus to offer some explanation of why bad things happen to normal people, in this case even while they were worshiping. They assume that a victim must have done something terrible for God to allow something so tragic to happen to them. Jesus denies that this is the case and answers that, likewise, the calamities suffered by the victims of the falling of the Tower of Siloam were not related to their relative sinfulness; he then diverts the focus onto the interrogators, wanting them to consider their own souls. Do you think that these Galileans were worse sinners than all the other Galileans, because they suffered in this way? No, I tell you; but unless you repent, you will all likewise perish.

Or those eighteen on whom the tower in Siloam fell and killed them: do you think that they were worse offenders than all the others who lived in Jerusalem? No, I tell you; but unless you repent, you will all likewise perish.”  

His mention of the fall of the Tower of Siloam added a nuance to his prior point: accidents happen. Therefore, even in the absence of persecution, death can come unexpectedly to anyone, irrespective of how righteous or how sinful they are. He may have been emphasizing that the time granted by God for repentance is limited.

Parable of the barren fig tree (verses 6-9)

This parable of Jesus (not to be confused with the parable of the budding fig tree) appears only in the Gospel of Luke among the canonical gospels of the New Testament. In this parable, the owner is generally regarded as representing God, who had a fig tree ("tree of knowledge") planted in his vineyard ("the garden of Eden") and came seeking fruit ("righteous works", which in part is a mystery). The gardener (vinedresser) is God and the vine is Jesus ("tree of Life"). Fig trees were often planted in vineyards. The fig tree was a common symbol for Israel, and may also have that meaning here, or the tree in the parable may refer to the religious leadership. In either case, the parable reflects Jesus offering his hearers one last chance for repentance. "These three years" logically refers to the period of Jesus' ministry. The parable has been connected to the miracle of cursing the fig tree. Richard Whately commented that this parable "is one which our Lord may be said to have put before his hearers twice; once in words, once in action."

Although the parable is found only in Luke's gospel, critics consider that there is no strong argument against its authenticity, for example a majority of the members of the Jesus Seminar voted it authentic.

Jesus healing a crippled woman on the Sabbath (verses 10–17)

This healing miracle of Jesus appears only in the Gospel of Luke among the canonical gospels of the New Testament.  According to Luke's account, Jesus was teaching in a synagogue on the Sabbath day, when he observed a woman who had been crippled "by a spirit" for eighteen years, and healed her with the words "You have been set free". This might therefore be classified as an exorcism. The gospel account relates the story as another example of Jesus clashing with religious authorities over how the Sabbath should be honoured: when the synagogue ruler tells the woman she should have come to be healed on a different day, Jesus denounces the synagogue leaders as hypocrites because they would release their animals to feed on the Sabbath, so why should this "daughter of Abraham" (verse 16) not be set free on the Sabbath from what is keeping her captive?

Verse 15 has the singular , hypokrita, in the Textus Receptus, but the plural , hypokritai, in critical Greek texts such as the SBL Greek New Testament. Hence the King James Version reads "Thou hypocrite", addressing the synagogue leader only, whereas the New International Version reads "You hypocrites!". Free church minister William Robertson Nicoll suggests that the comment was "directed against the class", i.e. the synagogue leaders collectively.

Parable of the Mustard Seed (verses 18-19) 

This parable is one of the shorter parables of Jesus. It appears in three of the canonical gospels of the New Testament. The differences between Gospels of Matthew, Mark, and Luke, are minor. In the Gospels of Matthew and Luke, it is immediately followed by the Parable of the Leaven, which shares this parable's theme of the Kingdom of Heaven growing from small beginnings.

A version of the parable also occurs in the non-canonical Gospel of Thomas 20.

According to rabbinical sources, Jews did not grow the plant in gardens, and this is consistent with Matthew's description of it growing in a field. Luke tells the parable with the plant in a garden instead; this is presumably recasting the story for an audience outside Palestine.

Parable of the Leaven (verses 20-21) 

The parable of the leaven (also called the parable of the yeast) is one of the shorter parables of Jesus. It appears in two of the canonical gospels of the New Testament and a version of the parable also occurs in the non-canonical Gospel of Thomas (96). The differences between Matthew and Luke are minor. In both places the story immediately follows the Parable of the Mustard Seed, which shares this parable's theme of the Kingdom of Heaven growing from small beginnings.

The narrow gate (verses 22-30)
And He went through the cities and villages, teaching, and journeying toward Jerusalem.
He is asked whether there are only a few who are (or will be) saved, a question "peculiar to Luke", although the answer, that the gate is narrow, and "many, I say to you, will seek to enter and will not be able", is also recorded in Matthew 7:13.

Jesus laments over Jerusalem (verses 31-35) 
Jesus confirms that he must continue to Jerusalem. Both here, on the journey, and at  when the city is in sight, Jesus contemplates the significance and fate of Jerusalem, the holy city.

See also 
 Sermon on the Mount
 Sermon on the Plain
 Ministry of Jesus
 Parables of Jesus
 Other related Bible parts: Psalm 6, Matthew 13, 23; Mark 4; Luke 19

References

External links 
 King James Bible - Wikisource
English Translation with Parallel Latin Vulgate
Online Bible at GospelHall.org (ESV, KJV, Darby, American Standard Version, Bible in Basic English)
Multiple bible versions at Bible Gateway (NKJV, NIV, NRSV etc.)

Gospel of Luke chapters